Michael Donald Brown (born August 5, 1953) is the junior United States shadow senator from the District of Columbia since 2007.

As a shadow senator, Brown receives no pay from the government, receives no budget from the government, and cannot vote on matters before the Senate. While he does not have an office in the United States Capitol or any of the Senate's office buildings, the District's government provides the position with an office in the John A. Wilson Building. Brown lobbies the United States Senate and the United States House of Representatives on behalf of the citizens of the District in their attempt to gain full representation in Congress, self-determination, and eventually admittance to the Union as a state. As shadow senator, Brown also works with the District's delegate, mayor, and council to advance the interest of local residents on federal issues. Brown was a member of the Democratic Party, until he changed his party registration to independent in 2014. He re-joined the Democratic Party in 2017.

Brown is known colloquially as "white Mike" to distinguish him from Michael A. Brown, another Washington, D.C. politician who shares the same name. Brown's opponent in one race suggested that some Washingtonians might be voting for Michael D. Brown thinking they were voting for Michael A. Brown; Michael D. Brown strenuously denied this possibility.

Positions
In 2018, Brown became irate that his delegation was not included in the D.C. Council's financing bill. After yelling and disrupting the proceedings, Brown quieted down after he was told that he would be forcibly removed from the premises.

2006 election

Brown ran for the position of shadow senator in 2006, using campaign posters with the slogan "the last Shadow Senator you'll ever need" and registering the domain name "shadowsenator.com" for his website. Brown opposed a bill to give the District a full representative in the House of Representatives because it did not make the District a state. In the Democratic primary in September, he received 73 percent of the vote, defeating his opponent, Ward 8 activist Philip Pannell. Incumbent shadow senator Florence Pendleton was not on the primary ballot after Pannell challenged her nominating ballots. Of her required 2,000 ballots, only 1,559 were found to be valid. She campaigned as a write-in, but received only 2 percent of the vote. Pannell blamed his loss at least partly on voter confusion, since the better-known Michael A. Brown was running for mayor at the same time; others, including Michael A. Brown himself, agreed.

In the November general election, Brown received 86 percent of the votes, while Joyce Robinson-Paul, a member of the D.C. Statehood Green Party, received 14 percent. There was no Republican candidate running for the position.

2010 election
Brown was a candidate for at-large member of the Council of the District of Columbia. Other Democrats running for the same position included Clark Ray and incumbent Phil Mendelson, who was comfortably re-elected. Concerned that many voters would confuse which Michael Brown was on the ballot, Mendelson sent out mailers with pictures of both politicians.

2012 election
Brown sought reelection to his position as shadow senator in 2012. He had the endorsements of District progressive organizations  and local Democratic party groups.  Brown was challenged by a wealthy District landlord Peter A. Ross who self-funded his campaign and outspent Brown by a more than 200:1 ratio.  Ross's campaign had to overcome news reports noting a past conviction for federal tax fraud and reports that he failed to pay his District real estate taxes. Brown won reelection.

2018 election

Brown faced a competitive primary challenge from Andria Thomas, defeating her by 51% to 47.3%. He was re-elected in the general election with 88.2% of the vote.

Electoral history

2006

2012

2018

Personal life
Brown was born in Newark, New Jersey, and moved to Montgomery County, Maryland, as a teenager. Brown received a bachelor's degree and a master's degree in public policy from the University of Maryland. Brown has lived in the District since 1984, and he currently lives in the neighborhood of American University Park. Brown is also the president and founder of Horizon Communications Corp., which provides direct-mail services to political organizations and non-profit organizations.

Race for DC Council
In 2014, Brown ran as an independent for a seat on the Council of the District of Columbia as an at-large member. He finished 3rd, but the top two finishers won the seats.

References

|-

1953 births
Living people
Politicians from Newark, New Jersey
University of Maryland, College Park alumni
United States shadow senators from the District of Columbia
Washington, D.C., Independents
Washington, D.C., Democrats